Mpombo is an administrative ward in the Busokelo District of the Mbeya Region of Tanzania. In 2016 the Tanzania National Bureau of Statistics report there were 9,684 people in the ward, from 8,787 in 2012.

Villages / vitongoji 
The ward has 5 villages and 19 vitongoji.

 Lusanje
 Ipogolo
 Ipoma
 Itete
 Masebe
 Ndamba
 Kasanga
 Igembe
 Kalambo
 Kasanga
 Kyejo
 Ijoka
 Ilundo
 Ipoma
 Mpafwa
 Ngunjwa
 Nsongola
 Lulasi
 Itongolugulu
 Lukata
 Lulasi
 Bwilando
 Bwilando
 Ikubo

References 

Wards of Mbeya Region